Dawn Sullivan (born c. 1978/79)
is an American volleyball coach,  and former player. She was named the eighth head coach of Missouri women's volleyball team in December 2022.

Personal life

Sullivan graduated from Marshall High School in Marshall, Minnesota in 1996, where she was a two-sport athlete in volleyball and basketball and received the 1996 Kaiser Award recognizing the female athlete of the year.

Career

Playing career
Sullivan played as an outside hitter at Kansas State. She was an AVCA All-American and All-Big 12 as a senior as she helped the team make the school's fourth consecutive NCAA Tournament appearance. She earned Kansas College Female-Athlete-of-the-Year honors in 2000.  

In her career, she notched 1,611 kills and 1,258 digs, which rank as the third and fourth-most, respectively, in program history. She is one of only five players at Kansas State to eclipse 1,000 kills and 1,000 digs.

Following college, Sullivan played professionally for the Grand Rapids Force of the United States Professional Volleyball League.

Coaching career

Sullivan began her collegiate coaching career as an assistant coach at Illinois State University in 2002. She joined Iowa State University as an assistant coach in 2005, where she remained until being named the head coach at UNLV in 2018. At UNLV, she led the program to two Mountain West Conference championships, two NCAA Tournament berths, and won the 2021 National Invitational Volleyball Championship. 

On December 18, 2022, Sullivan was named the eighth head coach for Missouri.

Head coaching record

External links

Iowa State Bio

References

1970s births
Year of birth uncertain
Living people
Missouri Tigers women's volleyball coaches
UNLV Rebels women's volleyball coaches
Iowa State Cyclones women's volleyball coaches
Illinois State Redbirds women's volleyball coaches
American volleyball coaches
Kansas State Wildcats women's volleyball players
American women's volleyball players
Outside hitters